Redmond P. Burke (born 4 November 1958) is an American congenital heart surgeon, innovator, software developer, author, inventor, and founder of The Congenital Heart Institute at Miami Children's Hospital in Miami, Florida. He starred in the ABC pilot television show The Miracle Workers. Burke has been recognized as one of the world's most innovative surgeons, and for his use of information technology to improve surgical outcomes.

Biography
Redmond Burke was born in Honolulu, Hawaii, to a US Navy flight navigator, Redmond Joseph Burke, and his wife Claire Lorraine Burke, both from San Francisco, California. In 1995, he married Kim Horstman, a registered nurse from Strongsville, Ohio, and they have three daughters - Olivia, Noelle, and Grace. Olivia is an undergraduate at The University of Miami. Noelle a senior at Ransom Everglades High School, and Grace is attending the middle school.

Burke and his three younger sisters, Alannah Radke, Claire Chinn, and Christine Jaeger, grew up in Cupertino, California. He was educated in public schools - Portal Elementary School, John F. Kennedy Junior High School, and Monta Vista High School, where he co-captained the varsity wrestling and Championship football teams, and won the Outstanding Wrestler award at the Central Coast Section Championships in 1976. Burke placed fifth at 165 pounds, in the California State Wrestling Championships that year. Burke's influential coaches included Patrick Lovell, Ron Edwards, Dave Vierra, Rudy Lapera, and Duane "Buck" Shore.

Accepted at Yale University, Brown University and Dartmouth College, he attended Stanford University, majoring in human biology. Notable instructors included Nobel Prize winners, Linus Pauling in biochemistry and Arthur Schawlow in physics. He walked on and made the Stanford varsity football team as a freshman under NFL Hall of Fame coach Jack Christiansen. Burke co-captained the varsity rugby team, touring New Zealand and Canada, where he played wing forward. He graduated with Honors and Distinction, with election to the Phi Beta Kappa honor society.

Burke attended medical school at Harvard University from 1980 to 1984. Influential instructors included Hardy Hendren, Paul Buttenweiser, Judah Folkman, and Nobel Prize winner Baruj Benacerraf. Nicholas Tilney taught a course in aseptic surgical technique to Harvard Medical students, and was a mentor. Burke was a student observer for the first heart transplants in New England, performed by Professor John J. Collins, at the Brigham and Women's Hospital.

Burke was selected for General Surgical Residency Training at the Brigham and Women's Hospital, under then Surgeon in Chief John A. Mannick MD, Mosely Professor of Surgery at Harvard Medical School. The Brigham surgical training philosophy was "see one, do one, teach one." The intense five-year program was notable for a rigorous call schedule - every other night in the hospital - with routine 120-hour work weeks. Notable instructors included Nobel Prize Winner Joseph Murray, who performed the world's first kidney transplant, and David J. Sugarbaker, who performed the first lung transplants at the Brigham and Women's Hospital.

In 1989, after completing general surgery training at the Brigham, and in preparation for cardiac surgery training, Burke spent a year as a research fellow at the Massachusetts Institute of Technology, in the Spectroscopy Laboratory, under Michael Stephen Feld, PhD. Burke developed the idea that Laser-induced fluorescence spectroscopy could be used to diagnose rejection in transplanted cardiac tissue, thereby avoiding the need for traumatic biopsies.

Burke was selected for cardiac surgery training at the Brigham and Women's Hospital, under program director Lawrence H. Cohn. He spent six months as the Chief Resident in Pediatric Cardiac Surgery under Professor Aldo Castaneda, and attending surgeons, Richard Jonas MD, John Mayer MD, and Frank Hanley MD. When Hanley accepted the position of Chief of Pediatric Cardiac Surgery at the University of California, San Francisco, Burke was offered his position, and he joined the Children's Hospital Boston attending staff in 1992, becoming an Instructor in Surgery at the Harvard Medical School.

Boston
Castaneda encouraged Burke to develop a research interest. He explored the possibility of using endoscopic surgical techniques for congenital heart surgery, designing instruments and techniques in the laboratory. He began clinical applications in 1993, subsequently performing a series of surgical firsts, including the world's first endoscopic vascular ring division, diaphragm plication, and thoracic duct ligation. Burke became a recognized expert in the field of minimally invasive pediatric cardiac surgery. He developed thoracoscopic surgical instruments with engineers from Pilling Weck, Inc.
Burke and Craig Lillehei, an attending pediatric surgeon, also performed the first three pediatric Heart-Lung Transplantations in New England, with the help of colleagues from the Brigham and Women's Hospital including Malcolm Decamp, and Sari Aranki. In early 1995, Castaneda retired, and Burke was invited to interview for a position as Chief of Pediatric Cardiac Surgery at Miami Children's Hospital in Miami, Florida.

Miami
At age 36, Burke became the Chief of Pediatric Cardiovascular Surgery at Miami Children's Hospital. Miami Children's Hospital is now The Nicklaus Children's Hospital, named after world-renowned golfer and philanthropist Jack Nicklaus. Building on lessons learned in Boston and Silicon Valley, Burke's program was designed around two key principles:
Reduce the trauma of care for each patient over their lifetime.
Leverage the power of information technology to improve medical outcomes.

Reducing surgical trauma
In an effort to reduce cumulative therapeutic trauma, the Miami team unified the efforts of cardiac surgeons and interventional cardiologists, attempting to develop less invasive treatments for a broad range of congenital heart defects. Beginning in 1996, Burke and the interventional cardiology team at Miami Children's Hospital published a series of hybrid approaches, where the surgeons operated in the catheterization laboratory, and the cardiologists performed interventions in the operating room. Many of these procedures used the video assisted thoracoscopic techniques Burke developed in Boston.

Burke and associate surgeon Robert Hannan worked with their Director of Perfusion, Jorge W. Ojito, to develop a less traumatic cardiopulmonary bypass technique. They also designed a miniaturized Cardiopulmonary Support circuit, allowing critically ill patients to be transported by plane, helicopter or ambulance over great distances on full heart lung bypass. In 2007, Burke and Zahn, at Miami Children's partnered with cardiac teams in Boston and New York in the first US trial of the Medtronic Melody Transcatheter Pulmonary Valve, which allowed patients with pulmonary valve disease to have their valves replaced without surgery. Burke performed the first open tricuspid valve replacement on a patient with a transcatheter valve after the patient developed severe early onset endocarditis in his Melody Transcatheter Pulmonary Valve in the Tricuspid position. The patient subsequently did well after surgical tricuspid valve replacement.

Information technology

When Burke arrived in Miami in 1995, he hired Jeffrey A. White to act as a technology advisor, working with the heart team to find and develop applications of information technology to improve medical outcomes. This collaboration resulted in a relational database for congenital heart surgery, a web-based information system for a medical team, and web based reporting of medical outcomes in real time. The web-based information system enabled a unique form of rounds, which they called "internet rounds," enabling information exchange and clinical decision making over the Internet. Beginning in 2002, Burke's surgical team started continuously measuring and reporting their surgical outcomes on the web. In 2006, Burke and White collaborated with IBM to create a voice activated medical information system for use in hands free hospital environments, like the operating room, allowing the surgeons to access critical information from their electronic medical records with voice activated commands. In 2007, Burke and his team enabled patients and families to access their electronic medical record, also known as a personal health record, any time, anywhere, with any web enabled device. In 2013, Burke's team was selected for the Google Glass Explorer program after presenting a YouTube video  demonstrating how they intended to "heal with Glass". Their proposal was recognized in several IT publications including PC Magazine. In 2015, the heart team used a 3D printed model of a child's heart and lungs to design a novel repair for complex total anomalous pulmonary venous connection. The operation was successful, and generated worldwide media coverage. In 2016, an "inoperable" patient with a single lung and hypoplastic left heart syndrome was referred to Nicklaus Children's Hospital. Using Google Cardboard as a Virtual Reality Viewer, a novel operation was planned and performed successfully. This unique synthesis of technology and surgery was recognized worldwide.

The Congenital Heart Institute
In 2002, the Arnold Palmer Hospital for Children in Orlando, Florida lost their congenital heart program. Burke initiated meetings with hospital administrator Janet Livingstone, CEO John Hillenmeyer, and Medical Director Mark Swanson MD, proposing that the Miami Children's Cardiac Team help rebuild the Arnold Palmer Heart Program. Arnold Palmer, the hospital's founder, approved of the plan, and used his considerable influence to finance the effort. The Congenital Heart Institute at Miami Children's Hospital and Arnold Palmer Hospital was created, with Redmond Burke and Evan Zahn acting as Co-Directors. The synthesis of Burke's work was to achieve resonance within a congenital heart team, a condition where every member of the team was driven by a common desire to reduce therapeutic trauma. To attain this resonance, the team continues to develop techniques in intensive care, information management, interventional catheterization, and minimally invasive surgery. The human side of Burke's congenital heart team at Nicklaus Children's Hospital has been described in parent's websites, and in the media. Immediately after hurricane Irma in 2017, Burke and colleagues Kristine Guleserian MD, Anthony Rossi MD, and Darline Santana-Acosta, MD worked with physicians in Puerto Rico to transport newborn babies with critical heart defects to Miami for urgent surgical care.

Television
Burke was cast as the host of the ABC network television reality program Miracle Workers, which first aired March 6, 2006. The program followed patients through complex medical treatments, showing the technical and emotional aspects of modern medical care. The program was controversial, as it potentially induced patients to give up their privacy in return for excellent medical care. Reviews were mixed, some finding the program "inspirational and informative"   and others finding the emotional content to be inappropriate. Burke wrestled with the ethical conflicts of a medical reality TV show. 
Burke has appeared on CNN (1996), Good Morning America (1997, 2006), The Today Show (1997), CNN Showbiz Tonight (March 8, 2006), Extra (2006) and Entertainment Tonight (1996) to describe novel medical achievements. Citrix, an international computer networking company, used Redmond Burke's experience with information technology to highlight their concept of on demand information - "for your life's work". Creative media teams have developed compelling connections between the Miami Children's Hospital Congenital Heart Surgery Team, and innovations in Information Technology.

Print and press
 Boston Herald - Boston, Ma. Merry Christmas, New England Family love is best gift of all.
 Boston Herald - Boston, Ma. One tough kid tugs at grandfather's tender heart.
 Sun Sentinel - Fort Lauderdale: Glad to be back: Last year, Kevin Stenmark had heart surgery. This year he pitched a no-hitter.
 Miami Herald: Zabriski keeping focus at PGA amid turmoil.
 The New York Times: For the Doctor's Touch, Help in the Hand 
 Associated Press: Doctors Risk Storm to Retrieve Heart For Miami Girl, 14, October 9, 1996 
 Sun Sentinel, Broward Metro Edition, Heart Surgery is Big Step for Infant.
 Computerworld: Now we're talking: speech technologies are moving far beyond call centers and into critical corporate applications such as search and security, by Drew Robb, October 2, 2006 
 Associated Press: Orphan baby finds love in Miami hospital,
 Sun Sentinel - Fort Lauderdale: The Ashley Phillips Story.
 Documentary: The life of a Congenital Heart Surgeon, by Photographer Jon Kral on Jon Kral Photography
 San Francisco Chronicle: Orphan finds love in Miami hospital 
 CBS News: Hundreds Gather to Celebrate Life 
 ABC News: Stem Cells to the Rescue: Fixing Heart Defects in Children 
 International Business Times: Google Glass #IfIHadGlass Contest Winners: 8,000 To Be Notified On Twitter

Honors
Blue Angels Flight
Best Doctors in America
Who's Who in Medicine and Healthcare
Valor Award, American Diabetes Association
Honorary Speaker Federal Bar 
Healing Heart Award 
Google Partner
Google Glass Explorer

Patents
Extracorporeal bypass technology

External links
 Pediatricheartsurgery.com
 The Congenital Heart Surgery Video Project on YouTube
 CardioAccess.com
 twitter.com
 Facebook
 myspace.com
 LinkedIn.com
 Scribd.com
 RedmondBurkeMD.com
 Google+
 US National Library of Medicine
 Congenital Heart Defect Modeling Project

References

American television personalities
Living people
Harvard Medical School alumni
American cardiac surgeons
Stanford University alumni
1958 births